Spiez is  a railway station in the town of Spiez, in the Swiss canton of Bern. It is on the Thunersee line of the BLS AG, which connects Thun and Interlaken, and is the junction for the same company's busy Lötschberg line, as well as the Spiez-Erlenbach-Zweisimmen line.

The station is served by various operators, including the BLS, Swiss Federal Railways, Deutsche Bahn.

Services
 the following services stop at Spiez:

Most northbound trains terminate in Basel; a single EuroCity and an ICE continue to Hamburg-Altona and one ICE continues to Berlin Ostbahnhof.

References

External links 
 
 Spiez station on Swiss Federal Railway's web site

BLS railway stations
Railway stations in the canton of Bern
Spiez